Włodzimierz Zdzisław Zieliński (born 29 March 1955 in Mława) is a former Polish handball player who competed in the 1976 Summer Olympics.

In 1976 he won the bronze medal with the Polish team. He played one match.

External links
profile 

1955 births
Living people
Polish male handball players
Handball players at the 1976 Summer Olympics
Olympic handball players of Poland
Olympic bronze medalists for Poland
Olympic medalists in handball
People from Mława
Sportspeople from Masovian Voivodeship
Medalists at the 1976 Summer Olympics